Heike Blaßneck (born 26 July 1971) is a retired German hurdler.

She finished eighth in 60 m hurdles at the 1998 European Indoor Championships. She represented the sports club LAC Quelle Fürth/München, and won the silver medal at the German championships in 1998.

Her personal best time was 12.86 seconds, achieved in July 1998 in Nürnberg.

References

1971 births
Living people
German female hurdlers
Athletes (track and field) at the 1992 Summer Olympics
Olympic athletes of Germany